Corydoras is a genus of freshwater catfish in the family Callichthyidae and subfamily Corydoradinae. The species usually have more restricted areas of endemism than other callichthyids, but the area of distribution of the entire genus almost equals the area of distribution of the family, except for Panama where Corydoras is not present. Corydoras species are distributed in South America where they can be found from the east of the Andes to the Atlantic coast, from Trinidad to the Río de la Plata drainage in northern Argentina. Species assigned to Corydoras display a broad diversity of body shapes and coloration.

Taxonomy
The name Corydoras is derived from the Greek kory (helmet) and doras (skin). Corydoras is by far the largest genus of Neotropical fishes with more than 160 species. It is the sole genus in the tribe Corydoradini. C. difluviatilis is recognized as the basalmost species of Corydoradini, exhibiting several plesiomorphic features compared to the other species of Corydoras. The type species for this genus is Corydoras geoffroy. Several hundred species are not yet classified, but kept by aquarists. These species are given 'C-numbers', originally devised by Hans-Georg Evers for the German fishkeeping magazine DATZ in 1993. In 2006, 153 C-numbers had been assigned, of which 32 had been assigned appropriate scientific names.

The species C. barbatus, C. macropterus and C. prionotos have been reclassified into the genus Scleromystax. Brochis had been differentiated from Corydoras due to the higher number of dorsal fin rays; however, Brochis has recently been suggested to be a synonym of Corydoras. This is contested and has not been universally accepted. The sixray corydoras belongs in Aspidoras.

Brochis
Brochis is a formerly recognized genus of catfish. Between one and three fish of the Callichthyidae in the Siluriformes order are referred to as Brochis, however following recent classification these three species have been grouped in the genus Corydoras. The genus is considered defunct by most scientific authorities, or as a junior synonym or subgenus of Corydoras. Consequently, it is an example of Obsolete taxa
 
Despite being considered defunct, there are several morphological differences that fish formerly classified in the genus Brochis have. These include a noticeably larger body, a more lyre-like tail and most decisively, the extended dorsal fins that have more rays than those of Corydoras  Corydoras have 7-10 rays on their dorsal fins, while Brochis have 10–18. Brochis are very large for their family, as all three species can exceed 8 centimetres in length.
In the Brochis stable, Corydras splendens is the largest. It is also the largest Corydoras attaining a maximum size of 9.9 centimetres and 40 grams

Ecology
Corydoras are generally found in smaller-sized streams, along the margins of larger rivers, in marshes, and in ponds. They are native to slow-moving and almost still (but seldom stagnant) streams and small rivers of South America, where the water is shallow and very murky. Most species are bottom-dwellers, foraging in sand, gravel or detritus. The banks and sides of the streams are covered with a dense growth of plants and this is where the Corydoras are found. They inhabit a wide variety of water types but tend toward soft, neutral to slightly acidic or slightly alkaline pH and 5-10 degrees of hardness. They can tolerate only a small amount of salt (some species tolerate none at all) and do not inhabit environments with tidal influences. They are often seen in shoals. Most species prefer being in groups and many species are found in schools or aggregations of hundreds or even thousands of individuals, usually of a single species, but occasionally with other species mixed in. Unlike most catfishes, which are nocturnal, these species are active during the daytime. Corydoras are capable of breathing both water and air, often swimming to the surface to quickly ingest air before re-submerging. The frequency of this air breathing behavior increases when Corydoras are exposed to water with low oxygen availability, allowing them to tolerate periods of aquatic hypoxia. 

Their main food is bottom-dwelling insects and insect larvae and various worms, as well as some vegetable matter. Although no Corydoras are piscivorous, they will eat flesh from dead fishes. Their feeding method is to search the bottom with their sensory barbels and suck up food items with their mouth, often burying their snout up to their eyes.

In several species of Corydoras, it has been observed that the fishes, after initial evasive reaction to threat, lie still; this is suggested to be a form of cryptic behavior. However, it is also argued that most species do not have cryptic coloration nor freezing behavior and continue to exist, likely due to their armor and venom. A few species of Otocinclus: (O. affinis, O. flexilis, O. mimulus and O. xakriaba) are considered to be Batesian mimics of certain Corydoras species (C. diphyes, C. garbei, C. nattereri and C. paleatus, respectively). These species have bony plates of armor and strong, frequently venomous spines as defenses, making them less palatable; by mimicking these species in size and coloration, Otocinclus avoid predation.

A unique form of insemination has been described in Corydoras aeneus. When these fish reproduce, the male will present his abdomen to the female. The female will attach her mouth to the male's genital opening, creating the well-known "T-position" many Corydoras exhibit during courtship. The female will then drink the sperm. The sperm rapidly moves through her intestines and is discharged together with her eggs into a pouch formed by her pelvic fins. The female can then swim away and deposit the pouch somewhere else alone. Because the T-position is exhibited in other species than just C. aeneus, it is likely that this behavior is common in the genus.

In the aquarium
The genus is well known among aquarists for its many ornamental species. They are well suited to tropical freshwater community aquariums, as they get along well with other species and are not aggressive. Corydoras are quite timid and peaceful and are recommended to be kept in shoals of four to six or more. Corydoras are mostly bottom feeders, so they should be offered sinking pellets as well as supplements of live and frozen foods. If flake foods are used, care should be taken to prevent all food from being eaten by faster moving fish at the higher levels of the tank.

Most Corydoras prefer soft, acidic water. They can, however, tolerate a wide range of water conditions, including temperatures that are cooler than tropical. They do not do well in fish tanks with high nitrate levels. This ion leads to the infection of the barbels, which will shorten and become useless. The barbels may also be affected by constant contact with a sharp substrate. Contrary to popular belief, these fish can be kept in a tank with gravel, as long as there are no sharp edges on the gravel without affecting their barbels, although they do prefer sand substrate. They are more likely to thrive if there is an open area of substrate on the bottom of the tank where they can obtain submerged food. It is a myth that salt cannot be used on this species of fish as a means of parasite medication. Salt can be added to the water of the Corydoras catfish in order to rid the fish of ich. These fish are fairly easy to keep, being peaceful, hardy, active and entertaining. Occasionally they will dart to the surface, sticking their snout above the water for an instant to take a breath of air. This behavior is perfectly normal and is not an indication that anything is wrong with the fish. However, if this is done in excess, it can indicate poor water conditions.

Where investigated, Corydoras sp. have been shown to be diurnal and crepuscular rather than nocturnal and activity can even peak at twilight. Corydoras are a very popular choice for a community aquarium and are widely kept throughout the world. Their longevity in the aquarium is noteworthy; C. aeneus is said to have lived 27 years in captivity and 20 years is not too uncommon.

Species
There are currently 161 recognized extant species in this genus, as well as one known extinct species:

See also
 List of Corydoras species
 List of freshwater aquarium fish species

References

 
Catfish genera
Freshwater fish genera
Fishkeeping
Callichthyidae
Paleocene fish
Taxa named by Bernard Germain de Lacépède
Extant Thanetian first appearances